Lieutenant General Thomas G. Miller is a retired senior officer of the United States Army and a former commander of the First United States Army. As head of the First Army, Miller was responsible for the training, readiness and mobilization of National Guard and Army Reserve units in all states and territories as they prepare for deployment as needed by United States combat commanders globally. He is the son of the late Colonel William H. Miller, who served in World War II, Korea, and Vietnam.

Military career
Miller was commissioned in 1973 as an Infantry Officer after graduating from the University of Southern Mississippi as a Distinguished Military Graduate. He has served primarily with Infantry, Special Forces and Airborne units. This included assignments in the 7th Special Forces Group, 82d Airborne Division, 101st Airborne Division, 10th Mountain Division and the 25th Infantry Division. Additionally he served overseas in Iraq, Kuwait, Haiti, Hawaii, Korea, and Japan. Prior to commanding the First Army, he served as the Director of Operations for FORSCOM and in Iraq as the Director of Operations for CJTF-7, and later as the Director of Strategic Operations for Multinational Forces Iraq.  Miller is also a graduate of the United States Army War College and holds a Master of Science in Management.

Awards and decorations

Other
Miller is also a member of the University of Southern Mississippi ROTC Hall of Fame.

References

External links

United States First Army Website 
Full Biography

United States Army personnel of the Iraq War
Living people
Recipients of the Defense Superior Service Medal
Recipients of the Distinguished Service Medal (US Army)
Recipients of the Legion of Merit
United States Army generals
University of Southern Mississippi alumni
Year of birth missing (living people)